The 1988–89 Eredivisie season was the 29th season of the Eredivisie, the top level of ice hockey in the Netherlands. Eight teams participated in the league, and the Rotterdam Panda's won the championship.

First round

Second round

Playoffs

External links
Nederlandse IJshockey Bond

Neth
Eredivisie (ice hockey) seasons
Ere 
Ere